The K League Players' Player of the Year is an annual award given to the player who is adjudged to have been the best of the year in South Korea. The award has been presented since 2007 and the winner is chosen by a vote amongst the members of the K League players.

This award was arranged by Korean edition of FourFourTwo, and was not an official award of K League. It was presented in summer unlike the K League MVP Award.

Winners

See also
 K League MVP Award
 K League Top Scorer Award
 K League Top Assist Provider Award
 K League Manager of the Year Award
 K League Young Player of the Year Award
 K League FANtastic Player
 K League Best XI

References

External links

K League trophies and awards
Association football player of the year awards
2007 establishments in South Korea
Awards established in 2007
Annual events in South Korea